The Hanriot HD.1 was a French World War I single-seat fighter aircraft. Of a total of about 1,200 examples built, 831 were produced by Italian companies under licence.

Development and production
The Hanriot company produced a series of pioneering monoplanes pre-war but had settled down as a licence manufacturer, notably of Sopwith 1½ strutters, when the HD.1 was produced in 1916. The type was a conventional fighter with the general characteristics of a typical Sopwith aircraft, being strongly but lightly built and combining clean lines with a light wing loading. It used the same "1½" (or "W") cabane strut arrangement as the Sopwith two-seater. It had a flat lower wing, though the top wing had quite sharp dihedral.

On the power of its  Le Rhone rotary engine it was not outstandingly fast but it was very manoeuvrable and proved popular with pilots as a safe and pleasant aircraft to fly. To maintain a competitive climbing and altitude performance it was usual practice to restrict armament to one synchronised Vickers machine gun, although there was provision for a second gun and one was occasionally fitted. In French-built aircraft the gun (or guns) were fitted to the sides of the cockpit and were accessible to the pilot without their butts being directly in front of his face in the event of a crash – an unusual but welcome feature, even if its origins lay in the form of the cabane struts. Italian-built versions mounted one machine gun centrally. The type was also produced by the Nieuport-Macchi company of Varese, Italy, which built almost 900 HD.1s between 1917 and 1919; more than the parent firm.

Operational history

The new type was ordered into production as a possible replacement for the Nieuport 17 but became "superfluous" when it was decided to replace the Nieuport with the SPAD S.7 in the French air service. Some were supplied to the French Navy, a few of which were eventually passed to the U.S. Navy – some naval Hanriots were converted to or built as floatplanes with enlarged tail surfaces.

The bulk of early production was supplied to the Belgians, who notoriously had to make do with the Allies's cast-offs. With the Belgian fighter squadrons the HD.1 proved surprisingly successful and the type remained the standard Belgian fighter for the rest of the war. Willy Coppens, the top Belgian ace of the war, was the most successful HD.1 pilot. At least one of his machines was experimentally fitted with an 11 mm Vickers machine-gun for use in balloon busting, something at which Coppens excelled. Most of his victories were balloons and many were claimed while flying various HD.1s. These aircraft remained in use until the late 1920s.

The type was also supplied in small numbers to the Italians, who manufactured it in quantity and used it to replace Nieuports and SPADs. The type was considered (by the Italians) to be a better all-round fighter than even the SPAD S.XIII and it became the standard Italian fighter, equipping 16 of the 18 operational Italian fighter squadrons by November 1918. Surplus Italian-built Hanriots were used by several countries postwar, including the Swiss.

The U.S. Naval Aircraft Factory built (or possibly modified/converted) 10 HD.1s in the immediate postwar years. These were mainly used as trainers, although they were also involved in experiments with take-off platforms on warships – they could be fitted with twin guns and at least one machine had a hydrovane and flotation bags of the type developed for the Royal Navy.

Surviving aircraft

Five examples of the HD.1 are preserved in museums in Europe and the US:
 
 CN 78 Musee Royale de L'Armee, Brussels
 
 CN 515 Museo Storico Dell'Aeronautica Miltare Italiana, Vigna di Valle, near Rome
 
 Flieger-Flab-Museum, Dübendorf near Zurich
 
 CN 75, The Vintage Aviator Limited, Hood Aerodrome, Masterton, New Zealand, a former Belgian aircraft, saved by Richard Shuttleworth before World War II, and formerly held by the Royal Air Force Museum This example was restored to airworthy status after being acquired by TVAL and is occasionally flown from Hood Aerodrome, Masterton in Wairarapa, New Zealand.
 
 CN 5934 Planes of Fame Air Museum in Chino, California. This airplane was flown by famed World War I French Ace Charles Nungesser in the 1925 movie The Sky Raider. May have been an HD.2C in the US Navy.

Operators

 Aviation Militaire Belge
 1ère Escadrille de Chasse
 Groupe de Chasse
 9ème Escadrille de Chasse
 10ème Escadrille de Chasse
 11ème Escadrille de Chasse

 French Navy

 Ecuadorian Air Force - One aircraft only.

 Corpo Aeronautico Militare - Standard Italian fighter at the end of World War I

 Paraguayan Air Force - Three aircraft only.

 Swiss Air Force - Postwar

 United States Navy

Specifications (HD.1)

See also

References

Bibliography

 
 
 
 
 

1910s French fighter aircraft
Hanriot aircraft
Macchi aircraft
Biplanes
Single-engined tractor aircraft
Aircraft first flown in 1916
Rotary-engined aircraft